Wes Chesson is a former professional American football player who played wide receiver for the Atlanta Falcons and Philadelphia Eagles.

References

1949 births
American football wide receivers
Atlanta Falcons players
Philadelphia Eagles players
Duke Blue Devils football players
Living people
People from Edenton, North Carolina
Players of American football from North Carolina